Andrew L. Erdman (born 1965) is an American writer and psychotherapist. He served as a staff reporter at Fortune magazine where he wrote a weekly human interest column and profiles of the world’s billionaires.  He has written for National Lampoon, Diversions, Women.com and LifetimeTV.com. Erdman has worked in television, serving as head writer for the talk/comedy/variety show Sex, Lives, and Video Clips (costarring Candace Bushnell) on VH1.  He received his doctorate in theater studies from the City University of New York Graduate Center. Erdman's book Blue Vaudeville: Sex, Morals, and the Mass Marketing of Amusement, 1895-1915, was published by McFarland in 2003. His book Queen of Vaudeville: The Story of Eva Tanguay was the first-ever biography of legendary performer Eva Tanguay (1878–1947), known as “The ‘I Don’t Care’ Girl.” The book was published in 2012 by Cornell University Press. In addition, Erdman is a trained psychotherapist and author on topics related to therapy and psychoanalysis. Credits include "Idioms of Attachment: Performative Dimensions of Object Relating, Affect, and Connection" (with M. Crocker of the Sexuality, Attachment, and Trauma Project), Psychoanalytic Review, 106(2):149-173 (2019), and "The Powerless Therapist and the Helpless Borderline: Acceptance, Aloneness, and Dyadic Joining," Psychoanalytic Social Work, 24(2):114-130 (2017). He teaches at the New York University School of Social Work.

References

 Blue-Vaudeville-Marketing-Amusement-1895-1915
 Stufft, Monica., Theater Journal - Project Muse
 IMDB bio of Leo Carrillo, Cartoonist
 2007 Literature/Film Association Conference

Andrew L. Erdman's website

American male journalists
American biographers
American male biographers
Hunter College faculty
Brooklyn College faculty
Graduate Center, CUNY alumni
Living people
1965 births